Joe Biden, the 46th president of the United States, has been active in politics since 1970. He gained a national profile after his first election to the United States Senate in 1972. During his long tenure in the Senate, Biden was seen as a compromising figure who has the tendency to commit gaffes. Biden's approval ratings as President have been  highly polarized, with mixed support from Democrats and opposition from Republicans.

Media reputation 
Biden was consistently ranked one of the least wealthy members of the Senate, which he attributed to his having been elected young. Feeling that less-wealthy public officials may be tempted to accept contributions in exchange for political favors, he proposed campaign finance reform measures during his first term. , Biden's net worth was only $27,012. , the Bidens were worth $9 million, largely due to sales of Biden's books and speaking fees after his vice presidency.

The political writer Howard Fineman wrote, "Biden is not an academic, he's not a theoretical thinker, he's a great street pol. He comes from a long line of working people in Scranton—auto salesmen, car dealers, people who know how to make a sale. He has that great Irish gift." Political columnist David S. Broder wrote that Biden has grown over time: "He responds to real people—that's been consistent throughout. And his ability to understand himself and deal with other politicians has gotten much much better." Journalist James Traub has written, "Biden is the kind of fundamentally happy person who can be as generous toward others as he is to himself." In 2006, Delaware newspaper columnist Harry F. Themal wrote that Biden "occupies the sensible center of the Democratic Party".

In recent years, especially after the 2015 death of his elder son Beau, Biden has been discussed for his empathetic nature and ability to communicate about grief. CNN wrote in 2020 that his presidential campaign aimed to make him "healer-in-chief", while the New York Times described his extensive history of being called upon to give eulogies. The Associated Press speculated that Joe Biden's ability to connect with those stricken by grief is partially why he won the 2020 Democrat presidential nomination.

In 2006, journalist and TV anchor Wolf Blitzer described Biden as loquacious. According to Ben Smith, writing for Politico in 2008, Biden often deviates from prepared remarks and according to Jake Tapper in 2007, Biden sometimes "puts his foot in his mouth". In 2008, Mark Leibovich wrote for The New York Times that Biden's "weak filters make him capable of blurting out pretty much anything". In 2018, Biden called himself a "gaffe machine".  Some of his gaffes have been characterized as racially insensitive.

In the years during and since his 2020 presidential campaign, conservative news outlets and politicians have questioned Biden's cognitive fitness and raised the possibility that he has dementia. Donald Trump has claimed that Biden has dementia and has insultingly called him "Sleepy Joe" at rallies.  In 2022, USA Today columnist Ingrid Jacques wrote that Biden's falsely claimed that Congress passed student loan forgiveness, when he in fact issued an executive announcement.  She argues that this "raises questions about Biden’s mental acuity".

According to The New York Times, Biden often embellishes elements of his life or exaggerates, a trait also noted by The New Yorker in 2014. For instance, Biden has claimed to have been more active in the civil rights movement than he actually was, and has falsely recalled being an excellent student who earned three college degrees. The Times wrote, "Mr. Biden's folksiness can veer into folklore, with dates that don't quite add up and details that are exaggerated or wrong, the factual edges shaved off to make them more powerful for audiences."

The Onion parody of Biden 

During Biden's vice-presidency, satirical online newspaper The Onion consistently portrayed Biden as an outrageous character who shared almost nothing with his namesake besides the title of vice president of the United States. The character was also known as "Diamond Joe". The publication portrayed Biden as a blue-collar "average Joe", an affable "goofy uncle", a muscle car driver, an avid fan of 1980s hair metal, a raucous party animal, a shameless womanizer, a recidivist petty criminal, and a drug-dealing outlaw. The Biden character became one of The Onions most popular features during the Obama presidency, garnering critical acclaim and a large readership.

Despite the extreme differences between the fictional character and the real politician, The Onion was regarded as having a significant, mostly positive influence on Biden's public image. Commentators noted that the character likely reinforced public perceptions of Biden as a political figure with populist working-class appeal and a good-natured, easy-going disposition. After briefly reviving the "Diamond Joe" version of Biden in 2019 for its coverage of the Democratic primaries, The Onion retired the character and began to satirize Biden in ways that drew more closely from real-world developments.

Approval rating

According to FiveThirtyEight, Biden's favorable approval rating remained higher than his disapproval rating until August 30 of 2021. By July 25, 2022, Biden was "historically unpopular" according to the same source, with an average disapproval rating of 57 percent and an average approval rating of only 38%, giving him a net approval rating of -19 percentage points—the worst at this point in a first term since Harry Truman 76 years before. On July 21, 2022, Biden's approval rating hit an all-time low of 37.5%. Immediately after that an upswing in his approval rating began and by August 21, his approval reached 41%, a level unseen since June 1, 2022.

See also 

 Joe Biden (The Onion)

 Hunter Biden laptop controversy
 "Let's Go Brandon"

References 

Joe Biden
Biden, Joe